The 1974 Penn Quakers football team was an American football team that represented the University of Pennsylvania during the 1974 NCAA Division I football season. Penn finished third in the Ivy League. 

In their fourth year under head coach Harry Gamble, the Quakers compiled a 6–2–1 record and outscored opponents 187 to 179. Marty Vaughn was the team captain.

Penn's 4–2–1 conference record placed third in the Ivy League. The Quakers were outscored 154 to 122 by Ivy opponents. 

Penn played its home games at Franklin Field adjacent to the university's campus in Philadelphia, Pennsylvania.

Schedule

Roster

References

Penn
Penn Quakers football seasons
Penn Quakers football